Mariana Mirna Seligmann (born October 9, 1984) better known as Muni Seligmann is an Argentinian actress, singer, songwriter, dancer, television presenter and model.

Biography 
Mariana Seligmann maternal family is of German descent.

Personal life 
From 2003 to 2004, Mariana Seligmann was in a relationship with the actor Diego Mesaglio.

On December 14, 2017, she married in a civil ceremony with Nicolás Naymark, a businessman and on December 15, 2017, she got married in a religious ceremony with him. Mariana Seligmann and Nicolás Naymark announced that they were expecting their first baby. On March 29, 2021, she gave birth to the couple's first child, a girl, whom they called Carmela Naymark.

Career

Television career 
Her professional career started in the year 2000 in the Television show Chiquititas. Thanks to her participation in this series, she  gets a role in the musical La Bella y la Bestia.

In 2002, she made her film debut, with the movie Imagining Argentina.

In 2003, she was summoned by Cris Morena to be part of the cast of the youth television series Rebelde Way starring Camila Bordonaba, Felipe Colombo, Luisana Lopilato and Benjamín Rojas, she  was also the back vocal and dancer on Erreway tours 2003 and 2004.

In 2004, she acted in theatre, in the play named O4, with Diego Mesaglio, Jorge Maggio and Belén Scalella.

In 2004, she was summoned by Cris Morena to be part of the cast of the youth television series Floricienta starring Florencia Bertotti and Juan Gil Navarro. Between 2004 and 2007, she made the theatrical seasons of Floricienta.

In 2005, she made a special appearance in the series Casados con Hijos.

In 2007, she was part of the cast of the horror film Left for Dead, she plays Michelle Black. In 2008, she was part of the cast of the horror film Dying God, where she plays Camila. In both films, she plays with Victoria Maurette. Both films are in English. Dying God is filming in France, and Left for Dead in United States and Argentina. 

Later she entered the world of Disney thanks to the fact that Cris Morena recommended her to work in the children's show Winnie The Pooh and later in Disney Live! La magia de Mickey Mouse.

In 2009, she became a children's entertainer, joining Diego Topa in the successful cycle Playhouse Disney.

In 2010, she acted in theatre, in the play named Bella.

In 2015, she is the main antagonistic of the miniseries Novela Tuitera.

In 2018, she resumed acting as part of the second season of the youth television series O11CE. In 2018, she was summoned by the director Marcos Carnevale to be part of the cast of the play Sin filtro with Carola Reyna, Puma Goity and Carlos Santamaría.

Singing career 
In 2016, she began her solo career with the release of her first single Mejor amigo.

In 2021, she publishes her first musical single, called Quiero darte. In 2021, she released her first solo musical album, titled Covers en la huerta.

Filmography

Television

Theater

Movies

Television Programs

Discography

Soundtrack albums 
 2004 — Floricienta
 2007 — Floricienta
 2010 — Lo mejor de  Playhouse Disney
 2010 — La casa de Playhouse Disney cantando con Topa y Muni
 2011 — Hermanitos del fin del mundo
 2011 — La casa de Disney junior con Topa y Muni

As lead artist

References

1984 births
Argentine film actresses
Argentine telenovela actresses
Argentine stage actresses
Living people
Argentine people of German descent
Actresses from Buenos Aires